William Mayow, of Gluvian, was Mayor of St. Columb Major in Cornwall in the early 16th century.

Following the Prayer Book Rebellion of 1549 the King's forces were sent down to Cornwall. The Provost Marshal at the time was Anthony Kingston and  his job was to punish the leaders of the uprising.

Others hanged by Kingston and his men included Richard Bennett, Vicar of St Veep and the Mayor of Bodmin (Nicholas Boyer).

References

1549 deaths
People from St Columb Major
People executed under Edward VI of England
Executed Cornish people
Mayors of places in Cornwall
Year of birth missing
16th-century English people
People executed by the Kingdom of England by hanging